Michael, Mick or Mike Malone may refer to:

Sports
 Michael Malone (basketball) (born 1971), American basketball coach
 Mick Malone (cricketer) (born 1950), Australian former cricketer
 Mick Malone (hurler) (born 1950), Irish retired hurler

Others
Michael Malone (author) (1942–2022), American author and television writer
 Michael Malone (businessman) (born 1969), former managing director and founder of Australian ISP iiNet
 Michael E. Malone (born 1967), member of the Maryland House of Delegates
 Michael P. Malone (1940–1999), American historian
 Michael S. Malone (born 1954), American author and former Forbes editor

Characters
 Michael Malone, a parody of Michael Moore, in the film An American Carol (2008)
 Michael Malone, the druid and godfather of Ruth Galloway's daughter who goes by the name Cathbad, in Elly Griffiths' Ruth Galloway series of novels
 Mike Malone, a character in the film 40 Guns to Apache Pass (1967)
Michael Malone, a character in The Unicorne Files series, by Chris d'Lacey

See also
John Michael Malone